Jodie Hamblet is a British TV actress; she is best known for her appearance in the soap opera Coronation Street as Gemma Davenport.

She made her debut aged 14 in Linda Green and later had roles in Coronation Street, Life On Mars and Shameless. She went on to play Vicky in the second series of My Mad Fat Diary.

In 2015, Hamblet first appeared as the vicious telephone operator Jenny Marshall in Home Fires. Hamblet appeared in the first series a leading character and then returned as Jenny once again in Series 2 with her character being even more vicious and nosy than either. The first series of Home Fires was met with great acclaim from high views being recommissioned for a second series ITV.

Filmography

References

External links
 

Living people
21st-century British actresses
British television actresses
Year of birth missing (living people)
British soap opera actresses